is a Japanese singer, guitarist and bassist known for being the frontman of EZO from 1986 to 1991 and Loudness from 1992 to 2000. He currently plays bass and sings duet and backing vocals, with occasional guitar in the New York City-based band FiRESiGN. He was vocally trained by Donald Lawrence, and moved to New York City in 1986.  He has a daughter, born in 1992.

Discography

Albums

Videos

References 

1964 births
Living people
Japanese heavy metal singers
Japanese heavy metal bass guitarists
Japanese expatriates in the United States
Loudness (band) members
Musicians from Hokkaido
English-language singers from Japan